An Artist of Life is a 1925 German silent film directed by Holger-Madsen and starring Erna Morena and Grete Mosheim.

The film's sets were designed by the art director Alfred Junge.

Cast
In alphabetical order

References

Bibliography

External links

1925 films
Films of the Weimar Republic
German silent feature films
Films directed by Holger-Madsen
German black-and-white films
National Film films
1920s German films